Rabacino  is a village in Gmina Studzienice, Bytów County, Pomeranian Voivodeship, in northern Poland.

From 1975 to 1998 the village was in Słupsk Voivodeship. 

It had a population of 133 in 2006.

References

Map of the Gmina Studzienice

Rabacino